Columbus and Ohio River Railroad  is a railroad in the U.S. state of Ohio owned by Genesee & Wyoming Inc. 

The main line, formerly part of the Pennsylvania Railroad's "Panhandle," was acquired from Conrail in 1992. It begins in Columbus along CSX Transportation and Norfolk Southern Railway tracks and stretches to Mingo Junction, Ohio near Steubenville on the Ohio River. It interchanges with CSX at Columbus, and Norfolk Southern at Columbus and Mingo Junction. The railroad also connects with Ohio Central Railroad in Coshocton, Ohio and Zanesville, Ohio. Ohio Central is also owned by Genesee & Wyoming.

There are trackage rights in Columbus, Ohio on CSX to reach Parsons Yard, and Norfolk Southern to reach Watkins Yard.

In addition to the main line (known as the Pan Subdivision), five additional lines are part of the Columbus and Ohio River:

Neilston Line - Former PRR line used to reach Grogan Yard in Columbus.
Mount Vernon Subdivision - Former B&O line to Mount Vernon, Ohio.
Cambridge Subdivision - Former B&O line to Byesville, Ohio.
Cadiz Branch - Former PRR branch to Georgetown, Ohio.
Piney Fork Subdivision - Using Ohi-Rail trackage rights to North Apex, Ohio.

The company was acquired by Genesee & Wyoming in 2008 as part of its purchase of the Ohio Central Railroad System.

References

External links

Ohio railroads
Genesee & Wyoming